Portugal Space (Portuguese: Agência Espacial Portuguesa) is the Portuguese Space Agency created by the Portuguese government in collaboration with the regional government of the Azores in 2019. It is headquartered at Santa Maria Island, in the Azores, Portugal. The agency succeeds the Space Office of the Foundation for Science and Technology.

Objectives 
Its objectives are to promote and implement the "Portugal Space 2030". Strategy to articulate the management of the various national programs linked to Space. PT Space is responsible for ensuring the regular publication of the Portuguese Space Catalogue.

The agency focuses on Earth observation and the small satellite industry in addition to the creation of a space port on Santa Maria Island. Overall the agency will focus on how space can be used to solve problems on the ground.

The National Space Agency coordinates Portuguese participation in the European Space Agency (ESA) and also advises the Portuguese government on contributions and subscriptions made to ESA. In collaboration with FCT, Portugal Space manages funds from ESA and the European Southern Observatory (ESO) and represents Portugal in these international organizations, as well as in the newly created Board of Directors of the European Solar Telescope (EST). Portugal Space is also Portugal's national representative to the European Commission for space-related matters, namely the European Space Program (Copernicus, Galileo, GOVSATCOM, SSA) and Horizon Europe and sits on the board of directors of the GSA (future EUSPA).

References 

Space agencies
Government agencies of Portugal
Organisations based in Lisbon
2019 establishments in Portugal